Mardum-i Hazara Wa Khorasan-i Buzurg (The Hazara people and Greater Khorasan) is Persian language book about the history and origins of the Hazara people by Muhammad Taqi Khavari.

See also
 The Hazaras of Afghanistan by Syed Askar Mousavi
 The Hazaras by Hassan Poladi

References

Hazara people
Hazaragi-language books
Hazara history